Kirsty Logan (born 13 March 1984) is a Scottish novelist, poet, performer, literary editor, writing mentor, book reviewer, and writer of short fiction.

Logan lives in Glasgow. She wrote her undergraduate thesis on retold fairytales, and her work has been broadcast on BBC Radio 4. She cites Emma Donoghue and Angela Carter as her main influences.

Work 
Her first collection of short stories, The Rental Heart and Other Fairytales was published by Salt in 2014. The collection was shortlisted for the 2014 Green Carnation Prize for LGBT writers, and also won the Polari First Book Prize 2015 (awarded each year to a writer whose debut work explores the LGBT experience), the 2013 Scott Prize for Short Stories, The Herald: Book of the Year 2014 and the Saboteur Award for Best Short Story Collection. It was also nominated for the 2014 Saltire Scottish First Book of the Year Award and longlisted for the Frank O'Connor International Short Story Award.

Her debut novel, The Gracekeepers, was published by Harvill Secker in 2015, and won the Lambda Literary Award for Best LGBT SF/F/Horror in 2016. She was interviewed as part of Glasgow's Aye Write! Festival in 2015 where she read an extract from The Gracekeepers, and on 25 November 2015 appeared as the Scottish Book Trust New Writers Award winner at Morningside Library in Edinburgh as part of Book Week Scotland 2015.

In 2013 the Association for Scottish Literary Studies selected Logan to be the recipient of Creative Scotland's first Dr Gavin Wallace Fellowship, to enable her to produce a collection of short fiction inspired by Scottish folklore. In 2015 this book, her second short-story collection, A Portable Shelter, was published as a limited-edition hardback by ASLS. In 2016 A Portable Shelter was longlisted for the Edge Hill Short Story Prize, and in 2017 the collection was shortlisted for the Green Carnation Prize. A paperback edition of A Portable Shelter was published by Vintage in November 2016.

Logan's second novel, The Gloaming, was published by Harvill Secker in 2018.

In 2012 she was one of twenty-one women writers and artists who contributed to the Glasgow Women's Library 21 Revolutions publication, released to mark the organisation's twenty-first year. She contributed a collage on paper entitled This is Liberty.

Awards 
 2013 Scott Prize for Short Stories: The Rental Heart and Other Fairytales
 2013/14 Dr. Gavin Wallace Fellow 
 2014 The Herald: Book of the Year: The Rental Heart and Other Fairytales
 2014 Saboteur Award for Best Short Story Collection: The Rental Heart and Other Fairytales
 2015 Polari First Book Prize: The Rental Heart and Other Fairytales
 2016 Lambda Literary Award for Best LGBT SF/F/Horror: The Gracekeepers

References 

Scottish short story writers
Scottish women novelists
21st-century Scottish writers
Living people
Scottish LGBT writers
Lambda Literary Award winners
21st-century British short story writers
21st-century Scottish women writers
1984 births
Writers from Glasgow
21st-century Scottish novelists
21st-century Scottish poets
Scottish women poets